The 1960–61 Mexican Segunda División was the 11th season of the Mexican Segunda División. The season started on 2 July 1960 and concluded on 26 March 1961. It was won by Nacional.

Changes 
 Monterrey was promoted to Primera División.
 Zamora was relegated from Primera División.
 Pachuca re-joined the league, after eight years out. Also, Cataluña joined.
 Irapuatense was renamed as Vasco de Quiroga.
 Oviedo was renamed as Texcoco.

Teams

League table

Results

References 

1960–61 in Mexican football
Segunda División de México seasons